Schwabenheim an der Selz is an Ortsgemeinde – a municipality belonging to a Verbandsgemeinde, a kind of collective municipality – in the Mainz-Bingen district in Rhineland-Palatinate, Germany.

Geography

Location 
The municipality lies in the north of Rhenish Hesse, south of Ingelheim on the east bank of the Selz.

Neighbouring municipalities 
Clockwise from the north, these are Ingelheim am Rhein with its outlying centres of Großwinternheim and Wackernheim, Stadecken-Elsheim in the Verbandsgemeinde of Nieder-Olm and Bubenheim in the Verbandsgemeinde of Gau-Algesheim.

History

Origin of the name Schwabenheim 
 11th century: From this time come documents that are known to refer to Schwabenheim. From this time forth, the place has been mentioned by the following names:
 1023 – Suabheim
 1051 – Suaveheim
 1140 – Suapeheim
 1200 – Suosabenheim
 1328 – Suabeheim
 1339 – Schwabeheim
 1424 – Schwabneheim
 1502 – Surschwabenheim, Sauerschwabenheim
 1904 – Beginning in this year, the place is called Schwabenheim an der Selz.

In terms of sovereignty, Schwabenheim belonged as an Imperial Village with Imperial immediacy to the Ingelheimer Grund

Court 
As part of the Ingelheimer Grund, Schwabenheim had its own local court on which sat the Ortsschultheiß (roughly “reeve”) and eight Schöffen (roughly “lay jurists”).

Politics

Coat of arms 

The municipality's arms might be described thus: Per pale Or and sable a double-headed Imperial Eagle displayed counterchanged armed, beaked and langued gules.
The double-headed eagle motif seen in today's arms goes back to a 15th-century court seal and a municipal seal from 1531. Both these seals showed a one-headed eagle, however. The eagle stood for Schwabenheim's – then still known as Sauer-Schwabenheim – membership among the Imperial Villages of the Ingelheimer Grund that passed in 1407 to the Electorate of the Palatinate. From 1761, the double-headed Imperial Eagle is seen in the seal. Given that the Grand Duchy of Hesse took over Schwabenheim in 1816, and that the National Socialists seized power in 1933, Schwabenheim's arms have been changed a few times. After the Second World War, the municipality bore the old Electorate of the Palatinate arms. This escutcheon, however, satisfied nobody. The unanimous opinion was that the Imperial Eagle belonged back in the arms. At two Wiesbaden state archive councillors’ suggestion in 1983, arms that were party per pale (that is, split down the middle), gold on the dexter (armsbearer's right, viewer's left) side and black on the sinister (armsbearer's left, viewer's right) side with the double-headed Imperial Eagle “counterchanged” (that is, on each side taking the tincture of the field on the other side; this is called in verwechselten Farben – in changed colours – in German) were put forth for approval and later the same year, the approval was granted.

Former coats of arms 
The municipality's oldest coat of arms bore an Imperial Eagle on a golden field. In 1742, this was replaced with the arms borne by Elector Karl Philipp of the Palatinate. The double-headed Imperial Eagle is witnessed in the municipal seal beginning in 1761.

Town partnerships 
 Chambolle-Musigny, Côte-d'Or, France since 1966
 Schmerbach, Gotha district, Thuringia since 1991
 Minerbe, Province of Verona, Veneto, Italy since 2001

Culture and sightseeing

Natural monuments 
Northeast of the village of Schwabenheim is a hiking loop through the Pfauengrund protected area.

Gastronomy 
Long established inns can be found in the lordly estates from the 18th century around the marketplace with its market fountain.

Buildings 
Furthermore, Schwabenheim has other things worth seeing, like the Irish-Scottish Church with its Carolingian lintel and Viergötterstein, the former provost's residence from the 17th century and the Town Hall built in 1742.

Regular events 
On the last weekend in August is the Backesgassefest (“Bakehouse Lane Festival”) on Backhausstrasse.
On the third weekend in September is the Schwabenheimer Markt at the marketplace.
On the first weekend in Advent is the Christmas Market at the marketplace.

Economy and infrastructure 
Schwabenheim is strongly characterized by agriculture. Dominating this field, as it does throughout Rhenish Hesse, is winegrowing with a cultivated vineyard area of 180 ha. In the Kaiserpfalz wine region, the municipality has a share of the Klostergarten, Schlossberg and Sonnenberg vineyards.

Some 25 companies marketing bottled wine make wine of all quality classifications. Besides the standard varieties Silvaner and Müller-Thurgau, newer varieties such as Scheurebe, Faberrebe, Bacchus and Kerner, among others, are grown. Red wine, too – Blauer Portugieser and Pinot noir – is made. Crops of almost all kinds of pomaceous and stone fruits and asparagus fill out the picture of this fruitful hilly landscape.

On the old monastery grounds, Intervet Innovation GmbH, a daughter company of Schering-Plough, has established itself. Intervet runs a global research and development centre there for veterinary products with the emphasis on antibiotics and antiparasitics employing 230 workers in Schwabenheim.

Transport 
The municipality is crossed by Landesstraße (state road) 428. The A 60 and A 63 autobahns can be reached by car in 10 to 20 minutes.

Famous people

Sons and daughters of the town 
 Anspach family
 Simone Renth, 1998/1999 Rhenish-Hessian Wine Queen, and also a year later: 1999/2000 51st German Wine Queen.

References

External links 

Schwabenheim’s history 

Mainz-Bingen
Imperial Villages